The Pleasant City Elementary School, at 501 21st St. in the Pleasant City neighborhood, was one of two black schools in West Palm Beach, Florida. It began on the first floor of the Mt. Parnassus Odd Fellows Hall, built in 1914 and designed by black architect Hazel Augustus. The School Board purchased and renovated the building in 1926. After school integration in the 1960s, the city purchased it and turned it into the Pleasant City Community Multicultural Center, which incorporated as a non-profit in 1994. As of 2004 it was a performance venue.

References

Historically segregated African-American schools in Florida
Buildings and structures in West Palm Beach, Florida
Community centers in Florida
Schools in Palm Beach County, Florida
Former school buildings in the United States
West Palm Beach, Florida
Defunct public schools in Palm Beach County, Florida
Defunct black public schools in the United States that closed when schools were integrated